Sinorbis is a software as a service (SaaS) company that sells subscriptions to a cloud-based digital marketing platform. The software aims to facilitate SMEs, enterprises and HEIs who wish to enter the Asian market. It was founded by Nicolas Chu and Allen Qu, in December 2015. The company's headquarters are in Sydney, and it also has offices in Shanghai, North America, Europe, and Colombo.

History 
Sinorbis was founded in December 2015, by co-founders Nicolas Chu and Allen Qu, and started its operations on 31 May 2016 after securing $1.6 million from early investors. The name Sinorbis is a compound of Latin words "Sina", meaning "China", and "Orbis", meaning the world.

A second round of funding, which was led by outdoor ad firm Executive Channel Holdings (ECH) and was concluded in May 2017, raised a further $2.3 million, bringing the startup's total fund to $3.9 million. Along with the second round of funding, Sinorbis also announced a number of advisory board appointments, including Bruce Fink, Principal of privately held Bickham Court Group of Companies and Executive Chair of ECH; Charles Parry-Okeden, the Global CEO of ECH; Chris Winterburn, Managing Director of Media i.

The first version of its cloud-based digital marketing platform was commercialised in July 2017. Sinorbis closed a $4m Series A funding round led by Jelix Ventures in September 2018.

Product 
Sinorbis' cloud-based marketing platform offers digital marketing, search engine optimization and web development tools with the aim to allow companies to build a web and social media presence in China. Through the platform, companies are able to build websites that are visible within the Great Firewall, and localized and optimized for China's four major search engines: Baidu, Sogou, 360 and Shenma. The Sinorbis Wizard tool uses machine learning to suggest website optimization updates.

Since the launch of the software, the company has developed a diverse client base and has gained a strong foothold in the international education sector, working with universities in the US, Australia, New Zealand, the UK and all over Europe. In response to the COVID-19 pandemic, Sinorbis made their technology available for free to international education providers.

In 2020, the company also added webinar marketing tools and Zoom integrations to its features.

The company's infrastructure is hosted via Alibaba Cloud and Amazon Web Services.

In, 2022, Sinorbis announces the launch of its Pan-Asian marketing platform, moving from being an app for China to becoming an integrated marketing platform for the whole of Asia, allowing users to publish content across Asian channels.

Media coverage 
CEO and co-founder Nicolas Chu has appeared twice on Australia's Sky News Business channel, to discuss the business opportunities posed by the Chinese digital market. He was also interviewed on ABC Local Radio program The World Today on 2 June 2016.

Awards 
On 28 June 2018 Sinorbis was recognised as 'Marketing Technology Company of the Year' at the annual Mumbrella Awards. In the same year, the company also won the Australian Business Award for New Product Innovation and was included in the Anthill Smart 100 2018 ranking. In 2019, Sinorbis received the award for 'Marketing Technology Company of the Year' at the annual B&T Awards. Sinorbis was ranked in Financial Times Asia-Pacific High-Growth Companies in 2021 and 2022.

References 

Companies based in Sydney
Chinese companies established in 2015